The Time Of The Doves (also translated as The Pigeon Girl or In Diamond Square; original Catalan-language: La plaça del Diamant, that is Diamond Square)  is a 1962 novel written by exiled Catalan writer Mercè Rodoreda.

The book is named after a square in Barcelona's Gràcia district. It is featured in Harold Bloom's The Western Canon as part of a list of canonical books of the "Chaotic Age". Arguably the author's most accomplished work, the novel has been translated into more than thirty languages and is regarded as one of the most important pieces of fiction in contemporary Catalan literature. It is also a staple of the curriculum in secondary school programs across Catalonia.

Set in Barcelona during the Second Spanish Republic and the Spanish Civil War, the novel pictures a young woman, Natalia, and her struggles in life as well as her relationships with two men: Quimet, her first husband, who dies in the war; and Antoni, her second husband. It is also chronicle of life in the city at the time, in a balanced mixture of psychologism and naturalism.

Adaptations
It was made into a film in 1982 directed by Francesc Betriu, and has spawned several theatrical adaptations, including a play directed by Joan Ollé in 2004 and another in 2007 adapted by Josep M. Benet i Jornet.

See also
Catalan literature

External links
 Qüestionari del llibre (material didàctic)
 Resum de l'obra per Sara Bailac
 Informació sobre l'adaptació teatral de l'obra al TNC (web del TNC)
 Informació sobre l'adapatació de l'obra al TNC (web de l'Ajuntament de Barcelona)
 Reflexió sobre l'obra per part de Carme Arnau a PENcatala.cat
 Apunts sobre l'obra - Rincón del Vago
 La Plaça del Diamant real amb l'escultura de la Colometa
 Any Rodoreda 1908-2008

Novels set in Barcelona
Catalan-language novels
1962 novels
20th-century Spanish novels
Spanish novels adapted into films